Ahmed Al-Shiekh (born May 11, 1964) is a Yemeni judoka, he competed internationally for Yemen at the 1992 Summer Olympics.

Career
Ahmed Al-Shiekh competed in the half middleweight class at the 1992 Summer Olympics in Barcelona, Spain, in the first round he was drawn against Davaasambuugiin Dorjbat from Mongolia in which he lost and didn't advance to the next round.

References

External links
 

1964 births
Living people
Yemeni male judoka
Olympic judoka of Yemen
Judoka at the 1992 Summer Olympics